Justo Giani (born 7 April 1999) is an Argentine professional footballer who plays as a right winger for Patronato, on loan from Newell's Old Boys.

Career
Giani began his career with Escuela Ñato, before signing with the youth of Quilmes. He made the move into senior football during the 2017–18 Primera B Nacional campaign, initially appearing in fixtures against Sarmiento, Villa Dálmine and Deportivo Riestra as an unused substitute. Giani made his professional debut against Nueva Chicago in November 2017, with manager Lucas Nardi selecting him to start a 1–1 draw. His first goal arrived on 9 December 2018 versus Instituto. He remained for the next two seasons, appearing twenty-two further times whilst netting goals against Tigre, Atlético de Rafaela and Gimnasia y Esgrima.

On 7 July 2022, Giani joined Patronato on loan until the end of the year.

On 22 February 2021, Giani completed a transfer to Primera División side Newell's Old Boys. He was sent off on his debut during a Copa de la Liga Profesional match away to Talleres, with referee Facundo Tello giving him a straight red card after seventy-seven minutes; he had only been substituted on twenty minutes prior.

Career statistics
.

References

External links

1999 births
Living people
Argentine footballers
Place of birth missing (living people)
Argentine people of Italian descent
Association football wingers
People from Quilmes
Sportspeople from Buenos Aires Province
Primera Nacional players
Argentine Primera División players
Quilmes Atlético Club footballers
Newell's Old Boys footballers
Club Atlético Patronato footballers